The 2012–13 Football League Trophy, known as the Johnstone's Paint Trophy for sponsorship reasons, is the 29th season in the history of the competition. It is a knock-out tournament for English football clubs in League One and League Two, the third and fourth tiers of the English football.

In all, 48 clubs will enter the competition. It is split into two sections, Northern and Southern, with the winners of each section contesting the final at Wembley Stadium. Chesterfield are the defending champions, having beaten Swindon Town in the previous year's final, 2–0.

First round
The draw for the first round of the competition took place on 18 August 2012. Sixteen clubs were given a bye into the second round, and the remaining 32 clubs, including the holders, were divided into four geographical regions.

Northern section

Southern section

Byes

Northern section
Bradford City, Bury, Crewe Alexandra, Doncaster Rovers, Hartlepool United, Sheffield United, Shrewsbury Town, Walsall.

Southern section
Barnet, Brentford, Cheltenham Town, Colchester United, Leyton Orient, Plymouth Argyle, Torquay United, Wycombe Wanderers.

Second round
The draw for the second round of the competition took place on 8 September 2012, with matches played in the week commencing 8 October 2012.

Northern section

Southern section

Area Quarter-finals
The draw for the Area Quarter-finals was made on 13 October 2012, and the matches will be played in the week commencing 3 December 2012.

Northern section

Southern section

Area Semi-finals
The draw for the Area Semi-finals was made on 8 December 2012, and the matches will be played in the week commencing 7 January 2013.

Northern section

Southern section

Area finals
The area finals, which serve as the semi-finals for the entire competition, were contested over two legs, home and away.

Northern section

Crewe Alexandra won 3–2 on aggregate.

Southern section

Southend United won 3–2 on aggregate.

Final

References

External links
Official website

EFL Trophy
Trophy
Trophy
2012–13 domestic association football cups